John James Bisset (1 September 1900 – 21 August 1966) was an Australian rules footballer who played for the Richmond Football Club and played for and coached the South Melbourne Football Club in the VFL.

Family
He married Bridget Catherine Quigley (1896–1971) in 1920. Their son, Ray Bisset, played for Fitzroy Second XVIII and Melbourne Second XVIII, before playing for the Moe Football Club; and their daughter married Des Healey.

Football

Nar Nar Goon
Bisset started his football career at Nar Nar Goon, captaining their 1921 premiership side. He also played with Nar Nar Goon in 1924 and 1925.

Port Melbourne
He moved to Port Melbourne in the VFA in 1922 was fullback for their premiership side in that year.

Stawell
He was captain-coach of Stawell in the Wimmera Football League from 1926 to 1927.  He began playing as a follower.

Richmond
He moved to Richmond where he made his VFL debut in 1928. He spent two seasons with the Tigers, 1928 and 1931, both ending in Grand Final losses.

Nhill
In between his two seasons at Richmond he was captain-coach at Nhill. In 1930, he was part of the combined Wimmera Football League team that defeated a combined Gippsland team 11.15 (81) to 4.8 (32), in the Victorian Country Football Championship match, played on Saturday, 9 August 1930, on a very muddy M.C.G.

South Melbourne
In 1932 he was recruited by South Melbourne and became their captain-coach the following season. Bisset had an immediate impact on the club, guiding them to their first premiership in 15 years — the collection of players recruited from interstate in 1932/1933 became known as South Melbourne's "Foreign Legion".

He remained coach until the end of the 1936 season having reached the Grand Final in every year. South Melbourne however could not repeat their 1933 success, losing the Grand Finals by 39, 20 and 11 points respectively.

Port Melbourne
He was appointed captain-coach of Port Melbourne in 1937; however, as a consequence of the team's poor performance, he resigned his position mid-way through the season.

Rainbow
In 1938, he was appointed captain coach of the Rainbow Football Club in the Southern Mallee Football Association. He was unable to play for part of the season due to having fractured ribs. Rainbow lost the 1938 Grand Final against Hopetoun Football Club 21.11 (137) to 11.6 (72).

Military service
He enlisted in the Second AIF in June 1940.

Team of the century
Having won 63 of the 80 games that he coached, Bisset was named coach of the Swans' official 'Team of the Century'.

Notes

References
 Hogan P: The Tigers Of Old, Richmond FC, Melbourne 1996
 Men Who Led League Grand Finalists, The Sporting Globe, (Saturday, 13 October 1934), p.7

External links

 Boyles Football Photos: Jack Bisset

 World War II Nominal Roll: Bissett (sic), John James (VX19505): note that he took 2 years off his age.
 World War II Service Record: Bissett (sic), John James (VX19505): note that he took 2 years off his age.

1900 births
1966 deaths
Australian rules footballers from Victoria (Australia)
Sydney Swans players
Sydney Swans Premiership players
Sydney Swans coaches
Sydney Swans Premiership coaches
Richmond Football Club players
Port Melbourne Football Club players
Port Melbourne Football Club coaches
Nhill Football Club players
Place of birth missing
Place of death missing
One-time VFL/AFL Premiership players
One-time VFL/AFL Premiership coaches
Australian Army personnel of World War II
Australian Army soldiers
Military personnel from Victoria (Australia)